Devin Green (born October 25, 1982) is a former American professional basketball player who last played for GS Pétroliers in 2020, winning the Basketball Africa League's (BAL) inaugural pre-qualification championship in Yaounde, Cameroon.  He played college basketball at Hampton, finishing in 2005. After his tenure at Hampton University he joined the Los Angeles lakers for the 2005-2006 season and following that with an appearance in the 2006-2007 Los Angeles Lakers preseason.

Professional career
He was undrafted out of Hampton University, and was signed by the Los Angeles Lakers as a free agent, appearing in 27 games in the 2005–2006 season. On October 30, 2006, he was waived by the Lakers.  Green played for the NBDL team the Los Angeles D-Fenders halfway through the season of 2006–07, but then left for the German Basketball League team RheinEnergie Köln.

As a member of RheinEnergie Köln, he won the 2006–07 German National Cup and helped reach the German national championship semi-finals.

He signed a contract with the Miami Heat on August 11, 2007, but was waived on October 29, 2007 from the team. In February 2008, he signed for the Italian First Division team of Siviglia Wear Teramo.

Green made another attempt to enter the NBA with the San Antonio Spurs in 2008 but was cut a week before the start of the regular season. He signed with Base Oostende, a top Belgian League club on October 31, 2008.

Green reported to Las Vegas on July 9, 2009 to participate in the 2009 NBA Summer League as a member of the Minnesota Timberwolves.  Green's summer was the subject of a documentary titled "Devin Green: The Journey."  The first four episodes are currently available on YouTube and at Green's Website.

In January 2011 he signed with PBC Lukoil Academic in Bulgaria.

During the 2011–12 season, Green played with the Erie BayHawks and Idaho Stampede of the NBA D-League.

In the summer of 2012, Green re-signed with PBC Lukoil Academic. In January 2013, he was released. Later that month he signed with Spirou Charleroi. He parted ways with Spirou Charleroi in March 2014. He then signed with Guaros de Lara of Venezuela. In April 2015, he left Guaros de Lara.

In the end of 2020, Green played for GS Pétroliers in the Road to BAL and helped the team win the West Division and qualify for the 2021 BAL season.

Notes

External links
 The Journey
 
 Eurobasket.com profile

1982 births
Living people
African-American basketball players
American expatriate basketball people in Argentina
American expatriate basketball people in Belgium
American expatriate basketball people in Bulgaria
American expatriate basketball people in China
American expatriate basketball people in Germany
American expatriate basketball people in Italy
American expatriate basketball people in Mexico
American expatriate basketball people in Ukraine
American expatriate basketball people in Venezuela
American men's basketball players
Barreteros de Zacatecas players
Basketball players from Ohio
BC Oostende players
Erie BayHawks (2008–2017) players
Greek Basket League players
Hampton Pirates men's basketball players
Idaho Stampede players
Los Angeles D-Fenders players
Los Angeles Lakers players
Olympia Larissa B.C. players
Ostioneros de Guaymas (basketball) players
Small forwards
People from Columbus, Ohio
GS Pétroliers basketball players
Shanghai Sharks players
Shooting guards
Spirou Charleroi players
Teramo Basket players
Undrafted National Basketball Association players
21st-century African-American sportspeople
20th-century African-American people